Kutha, Cuthah, Cuth or Cutha (Sumerian: Gudua), modern Tell Ibrahim, formerly known as Kutha Rabba, is an archaeological site in Babil Governorate, Iraq. Archaeological investigations have revealed remains of the Neo-Babylonian period and Kutha appears frequently in historical sources such.

History of archaeological research
The first archaeologist to examine the site, George Rawlinson, noted a brick of king Nebuchadrezzar II of the Neo-Babylonian Empire mentioning the city of Kutha. The site was also visited by George Smith and by Edgar James Banks. Tell Ibrahim was excavated by Hormuzd Rassam in 1881, for four weeks. Little was discovered, mainly some inscribed bowls and a few tablets.

Kutha and its environment
The site consists of two tells or settlement mounds. A smaller mound is located to the west. The two mounds, as is typical in the region, are separated by the dry bed of an ancient canal, the Shatt en-Nil.

Kutha in textual sources
According to the Tanakh, Cuthah was one of the five Syrian and Mesopotamian cities from which Sargon II, King of Assyria, brought settlers to take the places of the exiled Israelites. II Kings relates that these settlers were attacked by lions, and interpreting this to mean that their worship was not acceptable to the deity of the land, they asked Sargon to send an Israelite priest, exiled in Assyria, to teach them, which he did.

The result was a mixture of religions and peoples, the latter being known as "Cuthim" in Hebrew and as "Samaritans" to the Greeks.

Kutha is also the name of the capital of the Sumerian underworld, Irkalla.

In the Assyrian inscriptions "Cutha" occurs on the Shalmaneser obelisk, line 82, in connection with Babylon. Shulgi (formerly read as Dungi), King of Ur III, built the temple of Nergal at Cuthah, which fell into ruins, so that Nebuchadnezzar II had to rebuild the "temple of the gods, and placed them in safety in the temple". This agrees with the Biblical statement that the men of Cuthah served Nergal. Josephus places Cuthah, which for him is the name of a river and of a district, in Persia, and Neubauer says that it is the name of a country near Kurdistan.

The so-called "Legend of the King of Cuthah", a fragmentary inscription of the Akkadian literary genre called narû, written as if it were transcribed from a royal stele, is in fact part of the "Cuthean Legend of Naram-Sin", not to be read as history, a copy of which found in the cuneiform library at Sultantepe, north of Harran.

Sumu-la-El, a king of the 1st Babylonian Dynasty, rebuilt the city walls of Kutha. The city was later defeated by Hammurabi of Babylon in the 39th year of his reign. In his 40th year Hammurabi reports working on the Emeslam temple of Nergal at Kutha.

Ibn Sa'd in his Kitab Tabaqat Al-Kubra writes that the maternal grandfather of Abraham, Karbana, was the one who discovered the river Kutha.

In The Last Pagans of Iraq: Ibn Waḥshiyya and His Nabatean Agriculture, Jaakko Hämeen-Anttila says:

"One might also mention the rather surprising story, traced back to 'Ali, the first Imam of the Shiites, where he is made to identify himself as “one of the Nabateans from Lutha” (see Yaqut, Mu'jamIV: 488, s.v. Kutha). It goes without saying that the story is apocryphal, but it shows that among the Shiites there were people ready to identify themselves with the Nabateans. Thus it comes as no surprise that especially in the so-called ghulàt movements (extremist Shiites) a lot of material surfaces that is derivable from Mesopotamian sources (cf. Hämeen-Anttila 2001), and the early Shiite strongholds were to a great extent in the area inhabited by Nabateans.

"Yaqut also notes, "the identification of Kutha as the original home Shiah Muslims believe to be the Abrahamic roots of Islam. Yet the identification of Kutha, and by extension also Abraham, with the Nabateans is remarkable."

Al-Tabari says in The History of Prophets and Kings that the prophet Ibrahim was the son of his mother Nuba or Anmatala, who was the daughter of Karita who dug the river Kutha, named after his father Kutha.

See also
Cities of the Ancient Near East
Short chronology timeline

Notes

References

Further reading
Julian Reade,  Hormuzd Rassam and His Discoveries, Iraq, vol. 55, pp. 39–62, 1963

External links
Digital Images of Tablets from Kutha/Cuthah
Temple Hymns at ETCSL
Incantation bowl found at Kutha - British Museum

Babil Governorate
Samaritan culture and history
Hebrew Bible cities
Archaeological sites in Iraq
Former populated places in Iraq